Harem refers to domestic spaces that are reserved for the women of the house in a Muslim family.

Harem may also refer to:

 Harem (zoology), an animal group consisting of one or two males, a number of females, and their offspring

Arts and entertainment
 Harem (genre), a subgenre of Japanese light novels, manga, anime and video games

Film and television
 Harem (film), a 1985 French romantic drama film
 Harem (TV series), a 2001 Norwegian reality TV series
 Harem, a 1986 TV miniseries starring Omar Sharif
 Her Harem (Italian: L'harem, released in UK as The Harem), a 1967 Italian comedy-drama film

Literature
Harem (Raffi novel), an 1874 Armenian language novel
Harem, a 2003 novel by Barbara Nadel, 2003
Harem, a 1993 novel by Colin Falconer
Harem, a 1986 novel by Diane Carey

Music
 Harem (album), by Sarah Brightman, 2003
 "Harem" (song)
"The Harem", a single by Acker Bilk, 1963

Places 
 Harem, Iran
 Harem, Syria
Harem District
 Harem, Üsküdar, Istanbul, Turkey
 Ottoman Imperial Harem, Topkapi Palace, Istanbul

See also 

 Harum, a surname
 Harem pants or harem trousers, baggy, long pants caught in at the ankle
 Haremlik, the private portion of upper-class Ottoman homes
 Polygyny, a form of marriage in which a man has two or more wives at the same time
 Imperial Chinese harem system